Nangalami, or Grangali, is an Indo-Aryan language spoken in Afghanistan. Zemiaki was formerly considered a Nangalami dialect, but has been reassessed and placed in the Nuristani language group being close to Waigali.

References

Dardic languages
Languages of Afghanistan